is a 2018 Japanese independent romantic drama film directed by Daigo Matsui. It was released in Japanese cinemas on July 7, 2018 by T-Joy.

Plot  
The story follows three men that all fall in love with the same woman. The men, in hope of securing the love of the woman, change themselves to be whom their love admires. The men become Japanese musician Yutaka Ozaki (1965-1992), American actor Brad Pitt (1963) and a controversial Japanese historical figure Sakamoto Ryōma (1836-1867).

Cast  
 Sosuke Ikematsu as Yutaka Ozaki ?
 Kim Kkot-bi as a princess
 Shinnosuke Mitsushima as Brad Pitt ?
 Koji Ookura as Sakamoto Ryōma ?
 Mahiro Takasugi
 Osamu Mukai

References 

2018 films
2018 romantic drama films
2018 independent films
Japanese independent films
Japanese romantic drama films
Toei Company films
2010s Japanese films